Ryan Destiny Irons (born January 8, 1995) is an American actress, singer and songwriter. Destiny is best known for her roles in the Fox TV musical drama Star, and the Freeform sitcom Grown-ish.

Early life and education
Destiny was born in Detroit, Michigan. Her father is a member of the 90s R&B group Guesss. Destiny attended West Bloomfield High School. In January 2011, Destiny won a singing contest to attend the red carpet premiere of Justin Bieber's Never Say Never.

Career

Music
In junior high school, the 12-year-old Destiny formed musical trio New Limit. Managed by her mother Dawn, the trio auditioned for America's Got Talent in 2010 and they made it to the finals until they decided it was not for them. By 2011, Destiny had signed with Universal Republic. The group would later split, with Destiny and her manager holding auditions forming a new group called "Love Dollhouse" The trio signed to All Def/Capitol Records, a label partnership with Russell Simmons, Steve Rifkind and Brian Robbins. The group released their debut single "Can I." The group disbanded in 2015.

In 2016, Destiny announced plans for a solo EP. She released her first single "The Same" in 2018, with a remix featuring rapper Tobi Lou being released the following year. Her second single "Do You" was released in 2020.

Acting
In 2010, Destiny appeared in an episode of the web series The Wannabes Starring Savvy. In 2011, she traveled to Los Angeles with her mother to start auditioning for projects. In 2013, she appeared in several episodes of the Detroit-based crime drama, Low Winter Sun. Destiny later appeared as the lead in the independent film A Girl Like Grace opposite Garcelle Beauvais, Meagan Good, and Raven-Symoné. The Ty Hodges produced film premiered at the Los Angeles Film Festival in June 2015.

Destiny initially booked the role of Tiana on Lee Daniels's hit musical drama Empire but due to her contract with All Def Music, she could not accept the role. In December 2015, Destiny booked one of the lead roles as Alexandra in Daniels' series Star – opposite Queen Latifah. The series premiered on Fox December 14, 2016 and ended after three seasons in 2019.

In November 2019 it was announced that Destiny was cast to play Claressa Shields in Flint Strong, a Universal Pictures biopic written by Barry Jenkins and directed by Rachel Morrison

Destiny currently has a recurring role on season 3 of Grown-ish as Jillian, a transfer student from Spelman College.

Influences
Destiny cites entertainers Michael Jackson, Freddie Mercury, Prince and Aaliyah as her primary influences. Destiny has also expressed admiration for singers such as Lauryn Hill, Brandy, India Arie, and Beyoncé.

Personal life
Ryan Destiny was in a relationship with actor Keith Powers from late 2017 until 2022. After 4 years together, the break up was announced by People Magazine online exclusive on January 18, 2022.

Filmography

Film

Television

Music videos
 Big Sean – "Paradise" (2014)
 Big Sean – "Single Again" (2019)
 Justin Bieber ft. Chance the Rapper – "Holy" (2020)
 Doja Cat – "Need to Know" (2021)

Awards and nominations

References

External links
 
 Ryan Destiny on Instagram

1995 births
Actresses from Detroit
21st-century African-American women singers
American television actresses
African-American actresses
Living people
Capitol Records artists
21st-century American singers
21st-century American women singers